The USA Hockey Arena is a multi-purpose arena in Plymouth Township, Michigan, opened in 1996. Originally known as the Compuware Sports Arena, its name was shortened to Compuware Arena on September 11, 2007, to better market the venue for non-sporting events it hosted. It was renamed again to USA Hockey Arena in 2015 when the USA Hockey Foundation purchased the arena.

History
Peter Karmanos, the President of Compuware and owner of the Detroit Whalers, arranged to build the Whalers a new home as soon as the 1995–96 season ended after playing that season at Oak Park Ice Arena and The Palace of Auburn Hills. The Compuware Sports Arena was constructed in six months time, ready for the 1996–97 season. The team remained the Detroit Whalers after moving to Plymouth Township and then were renamed the Plymouth Whalers in 1997–98.

The complex features two arenas: the main arena, where the Whalers played their home games, is standard NHL-size and has seating for roughly four thousand people; it also has a larger (in terms of ice area) Olympic-size ice surface, which has much more limited seating (800 seats) on only one side of the ice.  The Olympic Arena is the home ice of Detroit Catholic Central High School although they occasionally play games in the main arena when strong attendance is anticipated.  The two arenas share concession stands, both of which have openings for both arenas simultaneously, allowing one set of staff to serve both arenas simultaneously.  Attached to the complex is "CJ's Brewing Company".  The arena was home to the now defunct Detroit Ignition, a Major Indoor Soccer League / XSL team, as well as the Compuware Ambassadors minor hockey program.  Previously, the arena hosted the now defunct Detroit Rockers of the National Professional Soccer League during its last season in 2000-2001

The arena also hosts the annual MHSAA high school state championships for boys ice hockey. On October 22, 2006, TNA hosted Bound for Glory (2006) at the arena. During the summer months, the arena's parking lot is home to a drive-in movie theater that features double feature first run movies on three giant screens.  It also hosts the commencement ceremonies for Adlai E. Stevenson High School, Northville High School, as well as for other high schools.

In November 2014, it was reported that USA Hockey had reached an agreement to eventually take over Compuware Arena by mid-2015, with an intent to relocate the National Team Development Program from Ann Arbor to Plymouth, and use the facility to "host and showcase other USA Hockey programs and international events". The Plymouth Whalers were to remain a tenant, but were ultimately sold in January 2015 and re-located to Flint.

In April 2017, USA Hockey Arena hosted the 2017 IIHF Women's World Championship.

Notable music performances
Gucci Mane, October 26, 2007
Journey, November 2, 2008
The Crofoot and AEG Live present: Girl Talk, March 3, 2011 (Sold Out) 
Five Finger Death Punch, December 16, 2011
The Crofoot and AEG Live present: Hollywood Undead, Asking Alexandria, Borgore, Destroy Rebuild Until God Shows, We Came as Romans, November 9, 2011
The Crofoot and AEG Live present: Pretty Lights, TOKiMONSTA, Paul Basic (Sold Out)
The Crofoot and AEG Live present: Passion Pit, Matt & Kim, Icona Pop, February 21, 2013 (Sold Out) 
The Crofoot and AEG Live present: High Velocity Super Action Fun Time Festival featuring: Bring Me the Horizon, We Came as Romans, Of Mice & Men, Attila, Issues, Northlane, Wilson, February 21, 2014 (Sold Out)

References

External links
 Official Website of USA Hockey Arena
 Official Website of USA Hockey's National Team Development Program
 Official Website of USA Hockey Arena Summer Drive-In
 Official Website of CJ's Brewing Company- Plymouth
 Official Website of Compuware Youth Hockey

Sports venues completed in 1996
College ice hockey venues in the United States
Indoor ice hockey venues in Michigan
Indoor soccer venues in Michigan
Ontario Hockey League arenas
Wayne State Warriors men's ice hockey
Sports venues in Wayne County, Michigan
Sports in Plymouth Township, Michigan
1996 establishments in Michigan